Rafajovce is a village and municipality in Vranov nad Topľou District in the Prešov Region of eastern Slovakia.

History
In historical records the village was first mentioned in 1596.

Geography
The municipality lies at an altitude of 185 metres and covers an area of 4.742 km². It has a population of about 170 people.

External links
 
http://www.statistics.sk/mosmis/eng/run.html

Villages and municipalities in Vranov nad Topľou District